Spanish oak may refer to trees or wood of any oak in Spain. It is a common name for several trees including:

European trees 

 Quercus pyrenaica
 Quercus x hispanica or Quercus × crenata, a hybrid of Quercus cerris and Quercus suber

North American trees 

 Quercus coccinea
 Quercus falcata
 Quercus rubra